Niton Junction is a hamlet in west-central Alberta, Canada within Yellowhead County. It is east of the Yellowhead Highway's junction with Highway 32 and west of Chip Lake.

Statistics Canada recognizes Niton Junction as a designated place.

The hamlet is located in Census Division No. 14 and in the federal riding of Yellowhead.

Demographics 

See also 
List of communities in Alberta
List of designated places in Alberta
List of hamlets in Alberta

References 

Designated places in Alberta
Hamlets in Alberta
Yellowhead County